The 3rd International Film Festival of India was held from 8 to 21 January 1965 in New Delhi. The third edition was the first competitive film festival ever held in India inaugurated by the then President of India Sarvepalli Radhakrishnan. The festival Chaired by Satyajit Ray for the first time was graded ‘A’ category by the Paris - based Federation International de Producers de Films. With this recognition the festival in India came on par with Cannes, Berlin, Venice, Karlovy Vary and Moscow International film festivals.

Winners
Golden Peacock (Best Film): "Gamperaliya" (Sri Lankan film)
Silver Peacock (Best Film): "Nirjan Saikate" (Indian film)
Golden Peacock (Best Short Film): "Cyclone" (Cuban film)
IFFI Best Actor Award (Female) (Silver Peacock) - Sharmila Tagore, Ruma Guha Thakurta, Chhaya Debi, Renuka Debi, and Bharati Debi for "Nirjan Saikate" (Indian film)

Opening film
"Ivaylo" by "Nikola Valchev"

Closing film
"America America" by "Elia Kazan"

References

External links
 

1965 film festivals
03
1965 in Indian cinema
January 1965 events in Asia
1965 in India